Mynäjärvi is a lake. It is located in the area of Pöytyä and Mynämäki municipalities, in Finland. Lake is in the Kurjenrahka National Park. Mynäjärvi is a source of the Mynäjoki (Mynä River).

Mynämäki
Lakes of Pöytyä